Uroš Kovačević (born 6 May 1993) is a Serbian professional volleyball player. He is a member of the Serbia national team. The two–time European Champion (2011, 2019), and the 2016 World League winner. At the professional club level, he plays for Aluron CMC Warta Zawiercie.

Personal life
He has two older brothers: Savo and Nikola (born 1983). Nikola is also a professional volleyball player.

National team
Kovačević is a gold medallist at the 2011 European Championship. In 2011, Kovačević was granted an award by the Olympic Committee of Serbia for the best young athlete. He was a member of the national team at the Olympic Games London 2012. On 19 July 2015, the Serbian national volleyball team reached the World League final, but eventually lost to France (0–3), and obtained silver medals. He was named MVP of the 2019 European Championship where Serbia won a gold medal.

Honours

Clubs
 FIVB Club World Championship
  Poland 2018 – with Trentino Volley

 AVC Asian Club Championship
  Naypyidaw 2016 – with Al Arabi Doha

 CEV Cup
  2018/2019 – with Itas Trentino

 CEV Challenge Cup
  2015/2016 – with Calzedonia Verona

 National championships
 2010/2011  Slovenian Cup, with ACH Volley
 2010/2011  Slovenian Championship, with ACH Volley
 2011/2012  Slovenian Cup, with ACH Volley
 2011/2012  Slovenian Championship, with ACH Volley
 2014/2015  Italian Cup, with Parmareggio Modena
 2020/2021  Chinese Championship, with Beijing BAIC Motor

Youth national team
 2009  CEV U19 European Championship
 2009  FIVB U19 World Championship
 2011  CEV U19 European Championship
 2011  FIVB U19 World Championship
 2013  FIVB U23 World Championship

Individual awards
 2011: CEV U19 European Championship – Most Valuable Player
 2011: FIVB U19 World Championship – Most Valuable Player
 2011: Award of Olympic Committee of Serbia – Young Athlete of The Year
 2013: FIVB U23 World Championship – Best Outside Spiker
 2016: AVC Asian Club Championship – Best Outside Spiker
 2018: FIVB Club World Championship – Best Outside Spiker
 2019: CEV European Championship – Best Outside Spiker
 2019: CEV European Championship – Most Valuable Player 
 2019: CEV – Male Volleyball Player of the Year
 2019: Male Serbian Volleyball Player of the Year
 2022: Polish Championship – Best Spiker

References

External links

 
 Player profile at LegaVolley.it 
 Player profile at PlusLiga.pl 
 Player Profile at Volleybox.net

1993 births
Living people
Sportspeople from Kraljevo
Serbian men's volleyball players
European champions for Serbia
Olympic volleyball players of Serbia
Volleyball players at the 2012 Summer Olympics
Serbian expatriate sportspeople in Slovenia
Expatriate volleyball players in Slovenia
Serbian expatriate sportspeople in Italy
Expatriate volleyball players in Italy
Serbian expatriate sportspeople in Qatar
Expatriate volleyball players in Qatar
Serbian expatriate sportspeople in China
Expatriate volleyball players in China
Serbian expatriate sportspeople in Poland
Expatriate volleyball players in Poland
Trentino Volley players
Warta Zawiercie players
Outside hitters
21st-century Serbian people